Labtec Inc. was a manufacturer of computer accessories, founded in Vancouver, Washington, United States in 1982. They were best known for their budget range of peripherals such as keyboards, mice, microphones, speakers and webcams.

Originally known as Spacetec IMC Corp, the company changed its name to LabTec Inc. in February 1999.  As Spacetec IMC Corp, the company manufactured 6DOF controllers for use with CAD software. A Spaceball 2003 controller was used to control the Mars Pathfinder spacecraft.

In late 2001 Logitech bought Labtec for approximately 125 million USD in cash, stock and debt in order to expand its line of audio products for personal computers and other devices.

References 

Telecommunications companies of the United States
Telecommunications equipment vendors
Videotelephony
Companies based in Vancouver, Washington
Telecommunications companies established in 1981
Technology companies disestablished in 2001
Logitech